Nikita Stepanov (born 6 April 1996) is a Belarusian professional footballer who plays for Atyrau.

International career
Stepanov earned his first cap for the national team of his country on 26 February 2020, playing the full 90 minutes in the 1:0 away win over Bulgaria in a friendly match.

References

External links 
 
 

1996 births
Living people
Belarusian footballers
Association football midfielders
Belarus international footballers
Belarusian expatriate footballers
Expatriate footballers in Kazakhstan
FC Smolevichi players
FC Luch Minsk (2012) players
FC Dnyapro Mogilev players
FC Torpedo-BelAZ Zhodino players
FC Neman Grodno players
FC Isloch Minsk Raion players
FC Atyrau players